Jonjić is a Croatian surname. Notable people with the surname include:

 Matej Jonjić (born 1991), Croatian football player
 Antonio Jonjić (born 1999), German-Croatian football player

See also
 Jojić

Croatian surnames